John Jefferson Whitacre (December 28, 1860 – December 2, 1938) was an American businessman and politician who served two terms as a U.S. Representative from Ohio from 1911 to 1915.

Biography 
Born in Decatur, Nebraska, Whitacre attended the public schools, Hiram (Ohio) College, and the University of Michigan at Ann Arbor.
He engaged as a manufacturer of hollow building tile.
He served as delegate to the 1912 Democratic National Convention.
He was an unsuccessful candidate in 1908 to the Sixty-first Congress.
He had a home built in Brown Township, Carroll County, Ohio. During the 1920 presidential campaign, both candidates, Warren G Harding and James M. Cox visited his home.

Whitacre was elected as a Democrat to the Sixty-second and Sixty-third Congresses (March 4, 1911 – March 3, 1915).

He announced he would not run for a third term in 1914:

He resumed his former manufacturing pursuits.
He served as president of the Whitacre Engineering Co. and the Whitacre-Greer Fireproofing Co.
He was nominated in 1928 for the 18th district, but lost.
He died in Miami, Florida, December 2, 1938.
He was interred in Magnolia Cemetery, Magnolia, Ohio.

Sources

External links

1860 births
1938 deaths
People from Decatur, Nebraska
People from Carroll County, Ohio
Ohio lawyers
Hiram College alumni
University of Michigan alumni
20th-century American lawyers
20th-century American politicians
Democratic Party members of the United States House of Representatives from Ohio